Molopo Local Municipality was a local municipality in Dr Ruth Segomotsi Mompati District Municipality, North West Province, South Africa, until the election of 18 May 2011, when it was merged with the Kagisano Local Municipality to form the Kagisano-Molopo Local Municipality.

Main places
Main places of the municipality, from the 2001 census:

References

Former local municipalities of South Africa